Anthony Leonard Randall (born Aryeh Leonard Rosenberg; February 26, 1920 – May 17, 2004) was an American actor. He is best known for portraying the role of Felix Unger in a television adaptation of the 1965 play The Odd Couple by Neil Simon. In a career spanning six decades, Randall received six Golden Globe Award nominations and six Primetime Emmy Award nominations, winning one Emmy.

Biography

Early years
Randall was born to a Jewish family in Tulsa, Oklahoma, the son of Julia (née Finston) (Apr 28, 1889 - Oct 3, 1950) and Moescha Rosenberg (Aug 6, 1875 - Nov 16, 1939), an art and antiques dealer. He attended Tulsa Central High School.

Randall attended Northwestern University for a year before going to New York City to study at the Neighborhood Playhouse School of the Theatre. He studied under Sanford Meisner and choreographer Martha Graham. Randall worked as an announcer at radio station WTAG in Worcester, Massachusetts. As Anthony Randall, he starred with Jane Cowl in George Bernard Shaw's Candida and Ethel Barrymore in Emlyn Williams's The Corn Is Green.

Randall served for four years with the United States Army Signal Corps in World War II, including work at Arlington Hall for the codebreaking Signal Intelligence Service. After the war, he worked at the Olney Theatre in Montgomery County, Maryland before heading back to New York City.

One of Randall's first acting jobs was playing "Reggie" on the long-running 1940s radio series I Love a Mystery.

Broadway
In 1946, Randall was cast as one of the brothers in a touring production of Katharine Cornell's revival of The Barretts of Wimpole Street.

Randall appeared on Broadway in Cornell's production of Antony and Cleopatra (1947–48) with Cornell, Charlton Heston, and Maureen Stapleton, and in Caesar and Cleopatra (1949–50) with Cedric Hardwicke and Lilli Palmer. Randall began appearing on television, notably episodes of One Man's Family.

Mister Peepers
Randall's first major television role was as history teacher Harvey Weskit in Mister Peepers (1952–1955). He continued to guest-star on other shows such as The Gulf Playhouse (directed by Arthur Penn), The Pepsi-Cola Playhouse, Kraft Theatre, The Motorola Television Hour, Armstrong Circle Theatre, Studio One in Hollywood, Appointment with Adventure, and The Philco-Goodyear Television Playhouse.

Randall replaced Gig Young in the Broadway hit Oh, Men! Oh, Women! (1954).

Inherit the Wind
Randall's first major role in a Broadway hit was in Inherit the Wind (1955–57), portraying newspaperman E. K. Hornbeck (based on real-life cynic H. L. Mencken), alongside Ed Begley and Paul Muni. On television he appeared in Heaven Will Protect the Working Girl (1956), co-written by Neil Simon. He also guest-starred on The Alcoa Hour.

Film star
Randall's success in Inherit the Wind led to film offers and his first significant big-screen role in Oh, Men! Oh, Women! (1957) for 20th Century Fox, which promoted Randall to stardom with Will Success Spoil Rock Hunter? (1957) alongside Jayne Mansfield. He played one of the leads in No Down Payment (1957).

In 1958, Randall played the leading role in the Broadway musical comedy Oh, Captain!, taking on a role originated on film by Alec Guinness. The show was a financial failure, but Randall received a Tony Award nomination for his dance turn with prima ballerina Alexandra Danilova.

Randall appeared in Westinghouse Desilu Playhouse, Goodyear Theatre, The United States Steel Hour, Sunday Showcase and Playhouse 90.

Continuing success
Randall co-starred with Debbie Reynolds in The Mating Game (1959) at Metro-Goldwyn-Mayer. He appeared in the hit film Pillow Talk (1959) supporting Doris Day and Rock Hudson; he would reunite with Day and Hudson for two more films.

He starred in an NBC-TV special, The Secret of Freedom, which was filmed during the summer of 1959 in Mount Holly, New Jersey, and broadcast on the network during the fall of 1959 and again in early 1960. On TV he was also in The Man in the Moon (1960), co-written by Mel Brooks.

Randall was top-billed in The Adventures of Huckleberry Finn from MGM in 1960. He had a Pillow Talk-style support role in Let's Make Love (1960) with Marilyn Monroe and Yves Montand and Lover Come Back (1961) with Hudson and Day. Randall continued to guest on TV shows including General Electric Theater and Checkmate. In 1961, Randall played a highly dramatic role in "Hangover," an episode of The Alfred Hitchcock Hour in which he portrayed an alcoholic business executive who strangles his wife in a drunken rage. He starred in a TV adaptation of Arsenic & Old Lace (1962), and had big-screen leading roles in Boys' Night Out (1962) and Island of Love (1963).

Randall starred in the classic 1964 MGM film, 7 Faces of Dr. Lao, which was based on The Circus of Dr. Lao by Charles G. Finney. In addition to portraying and voicing the eponymous seven faces (Dr. Lao, the Abominable Snowman, Merlin, Appolonius of Tyana, The Giant Serpent, Pan, and Medusa), Randall also appeared without makeup in a two-second cameo as a solemn spectator in the crowd, for a total of eight roles in the film.

He played the lead in The Brass Bottle (1964) and made one last film with Hudson and Day, Send Me No Flowers (1965). Randall took the lead in Fluffy (1965), a comedy about a lion; The Alphabet Murders (1965), playing Hercule Poirot for Frank Tashlin; Our Man in Marrakesh (1966), as a secret agent; and Hello Down There (1969).

Randall returned to Broadway in UTBU (1966), which had only a short run. He appeared in the TV movie The Littlest Angel (1969) with Johnny Whitaker and Fred Gwynne.

The Odd Couple

Randall returned to television in 1970 as Felix Unger in The Odd Couple, opposite Jack Klugman, a role that lasted five years. The names of Felix's children on The Odd Couple were Edna and Leonard, named for Randall's sister and Randall himself. 

In 1974, Randall and Klugman appeared in television spots endorsing a Yahtzee spinoff, Challenge Yahtzee. They appeared in character as Felix and Oscar, and the TV spots were filmed on the set of The Odd Couple. 

During the series run, Randall took a small role in Everything You Always Wanted to Know About Sex* (*But Were Afraid to Ask) (1972).

In 1973, he was hired to play the voice of Templeton the gluttonous rat in Charlotte's Web, and recorded the part, but was replaced in the film by Paul Lynde, as Randall's voice was perceived as too sophisticated by the director, who wanted Templeton to have a nasal voice.

The Tony Randall Show 
Beginning in 1976, Randall starred for two seasons in The Tony Randall Show, playing Philadelphia judge Walter Franklin. He had roles in Kate Bliss and the Ticker Tape Kid (1978), Scavenger Hunt (1979), and Foolin' Around (1980).

Love, Sidney
Randall starred in the NBC series Love, Sidney from 1981 to 1983. In the TV movie that served as the show's pilot, Sidney Shorr: A Girl's Best Friend, Sidney Shorr was written as a middle-aged homosexual man; the character's sexuality was made ambiguous for the series. After the show was canceled in 1983, Randall refused to star in another television series, favoring the Broadway stage as his medium.

Randall continued to appear in TV movies. He starred in Sunday Drive (1986) for Disney, Save the Dog! (1988), and The Man in the Brown Suit (1989). From October 30 to November 2, 1987, he hosted the free preview of HBO's short-lived premium channel Festival.

In 1989, Randall returned to Broadway as a replacement in M. Butterfly.

National Actors Theatre
In 1991, Randall founded the National Actors Theatre, ultimately based at Pace University in New York City. Their productions included The Crucible (1991), A Little Hotel on the Side (1992), The Master Builder (1992), The Seagull (1992), Saint Joan (1993), Three Men on a Horse (1993), Timon of Athens (1993), The Government Inspector (1993), The Flowering Peach (1994), Gentlemen Prefer Blondes (1994), The School for Scandal (1995), Inherit the Wind (1996), and The Gin Game (1997). In 1997, he performed in The Sunshine Boys with Klugman to great success.

In September 1993, Randall and Klugman reunited in the CBS-TV movie The Odd Couple: Together Again, reprising their roles. The story began when, after Felix ruined plans for his daughter Edna's wedding, his wife Gloria threw him out of the house for 11 days, which left him no choice but to move back in with Oscar and to help him recover, getting him back in shape after throat cancer surgery had left his voice very raspy.

Randall's later stage productions included Night Must Fall (1999) and Judgment at Nuremberg (2001).

Periodically, he performed in stage revivals of The Odd Couple with Klugman, including a stint in London in 1996. Later film roles included Fatal Instinct (1994) and Down with Love (2003).

Randall's last appearances on stage as an actor were in The Resistible Rise of Arturo Ui (2002) and Right You Are (2003).

Guest appearances
On September 4, 1955, Randall and Klugman appeared together with Gena Rowlands in the episode "The Pirate's House" of the CBS anthology series Appointment with Adventure.

Randall was a frequent guest on The Tonight Show Starring Johnny Carson and often spoke of his love of opera and the salaciousness of many of its plotlines. He also admitted to sneaking tape recorders into operas to make his own private recordings. He chided Johnny Carson for his chain smoking and was generally fastidious. At the time of his death, Randall had appeared as a guest on The Tonight Show 105 times, more often than any other celebrity had appeared.

Randall was well known for being a guest panelist on the game show What’s My Line?, from 1958 to 1967, Password, The Hollywood Squares, and the $10,000 and $20,000 Pyramids. He also parodied his pompous image with an appearance as a "contestant" on The Gong Show in 1977.

Randall was a guest star on the fifth and final season of The Muppet Show in an episode that first aired on October 11, 1980. This was the 100th episode of the show.

Randall, along with John Goodman and Drew Barrymore, was among the first guests on the debut episode of Late Night with Conan O'Brien on September 13, 1993. He would also appear in Conan O'Brien's 5th Anniversary Special with the character PimpBot 5000. Randall was a frequent guest as well on both of David Letterman's late-night shows Late Night with David Letterman and the Late Show with David Letterman, making 70 appearances, according to his obituary in The Washington Post. Letterman said that Randall was one of his favorite guests, along with Regis Philbin. 

On November 7, 1994, Randall appeared on the game show Jeopardy!, as part of a celebrity episode, playing on behalf of the National Actors Theatre. He came in second place behind General Norman Schwarzkopf Jr. but ahead of actress Stefanie Powers, with a final tally of $9,900.

Other creative activities
In 1973, Randall and Klugman recorded an album for London Records titled The Odd Couple Sings. Roland Shaw and the London Festival Orchestra and Chorus provided the music and additional vocals. The record was not a chart-topper but is a highly sought-after item for many Odd Couple fans. Randall and Klugman also collaborated on a series of television commercials for Eagle brand snacks.

A noted raconteur, Randall, along with co-writer Mike Mindlin, wrote a collection of amusing and sometimes racy showbusiness anecdotes called Which Reminds Me, published in 1989.

In keeping with his penchant for both championing and mocking the culture that he loved, during the Big Band-era revival in the mid-1960s, Randall produced a record album of 1930s songs, Vo, Vo, De, Oh, Doe, inspired by (and covering) the New Vaudeville Band's one-hit wonder, "Winchester Cathedral." He mimicked (and somewhat exaggerated) the vibrato style of Carmen Lombardo, and the two had once sung a duet of Lombardo's signature song "Boo Hoo (You've Got Me Crying for You)" on The Tonight Show.

In the 1980s, Randall served as off-camera narrator for several video productions by the Metropolitan Opera, announcing performers to the television audience as they appeared on stage during curtain calls and providing brief descriptions of scenes. 

For the 1990 sequel Gremlins 2: The New Batch, Randall voiced the Brain Gremlin.

Personal life

Randall was married to his high school sweetheart, Florence Gibbs, from 1938 until her death from cancer on April 18, 1992. On November 17, 1995, at the age of 75, he married 25-year-old Heather Harlan, an understudy from The School for Scandal in which Randall was starring at National Actors Theatre; the ceremony was officiated by  Rudy Giuliani. They lived in a Manhattan apartment and bought a vacation apartment in Key Biscayne, Florida, in 2003. The couple had two children, Julia, born on April 11, 1997, and Jefferson, born on June 15, 1998—and remained married until Randall's death in May 2004.

In his book Which Reminds Me, Randall maintained that any publicity that an actor generates should be about his work, not himself: "The public knows only one thing about me: I don't smoke."

Advocacy and Politics
Randall was an advocate for the arts. During the summer of 1980, he served as the celebrity host of the New York Philharmonic Orchestra's concerts in Central Park, New York City.

Randall was politically liberal. He was an active supporter of Eugene McCarthy during the 1968 Democratic Party presidential primaries. When he was dropped as a regular panelist on the Opera Quiz intermission feature of the Metropolitan Opera radio broadcasts because of his opposition to the Vietnam War, he donated the remainder of his contract fee to the McCarthy campaign. During the U.S. presidential primaries in 1972, he appeared as the featured celebrity at numerous fundraising house parties for Democratic Party candidate George McGovern. His name was featured on the master list of Richard Nixon's political opponents.

Death
Randall died in his sleep on May 17, 2004, at NYU Medical Center of pneumonia that he had contracted following coronary bypass surgery in December 2003. He had been hospitalized since the operation. His remains are interred at the Westchester Hills Cemetery in Hastings-on-Hudson, New York.

Filmography

Awards and nominations

Honors
 In 1993, he received The Hundred Year Association of New York's Gold Medal Award "in recognition of outstanding contributions to the City of New York."
 In 1999, the City College of New York honored Randall with the John H. Finley Award for outstanding service to the City of New York.
 In 2003, Pace University granted him an honorary Doctor of Fine Arts degree.

Bibliography

See also

References

External links

 
 
 
 
 
 Tony Randall papers, 1957-1981, held by the Billy Rose Theatre Division, New York Public Library for the Performing Arts

1920 births
2004 deaths
American male film actors
American male radio actors
American male musical theatre actors
American male stage actors
American male television actors
Jewish American male actors
Male actors from Tulsa, Oklahoma
United States Army personnel of World War II
Outstanding Performance by a Lead Actor in a Comedy Series Primetime Emmy Award winners
Imperial Records artists
Burials at Westchester Hills Cemetery
Deaths from pneumonia in New York City
Central High School (Tulsa, Oklahoma) alumni
Jewish American military personnel
Northwestern University alumni
Neighborhood Playhouse School of the Theatre alumni
Oklahoma Democrats
New York (state) Democrats
California Democrats
Massachusetts Democrats
20th-century American male actors
Signals Intelligence Service cryptographers
Military personnel from Oklahoma
20th-century American male singers
20th-century American singers
20th-century American Jews
21st-century American Jews